Lisa Marie Kwayie (born 27 October 1996) is a German sprinter. She won a bronze medal in the 4 × 100 metres relay at the 2018 European Championships.

International competitions

Personal bests
Outdoor
100 metres – 11.29 (+1.9 m/s, Clermont 2018)
200 metres – 22.77 (+0.9 m/s, Doha 2019)
Indoor
60 metres – 7.38 (Leipzig 2016)
200 metres – 23.62 (Leipzig 2017)

References

1996 births
Living people
People from Sunyani District
German female sprinters
Universiade bronze medalists for Germany
Universiade medalists in athletics (track and field)
Medalists at the 2019 Summer Universiade
World Athletics Championships athletes for Germany
German national athletics champions
Ghanaian emigrants to Germany
Athletes (track and field) at the 2020 Summer Olympics
Olympic athletes of Germany